This list of museums in Virginia, United States, contains museums which are defined for this context as institutions (including nonprofit organizations, government entities, and private businesses) that collect and care for objects of cultural, artistic, scientific, or historical interest and make their collections or related exhibits available for public viewing. Museums that exist only in cyberspace (i.e., virtual museums) are not included.

This is a sortable list. Click on the small boxes next to any heading title to reorder the list (in alphabetical order or reverse alphabetical order) by that category.

Museums

Defunct museums
 Anderson Gallery, Richmond, part of VCU School of the Arts, closed in 2015, collection moved to VCU Libraries
 Artisans Center of Virginia Galleries, Waynesboro, closed the galleries in 2009
 Beebe Ranch, Chincoteaque, closed in 2010
 Claude Moore Colonial Farm
 Civil War Life Museum, Massaponax
 Collingwood Library and Museum, Alexandria
 Dennis Reedy Railroad & Coalmining Museum, Clinchco
 Freedom Park, Arlington, former sculpture park
 Frontier City, Virginia Beach
 Jeane Dixon Museum and Library, Strasburg
 Marine Corps Air-Ground Museum - Marine Corps Base Quantico
 Morgan-McClure Motorsports Museum, Abingdon
 Museum of American Presidents, Strasburg
 Natural Bridge Toy Museum, Natural Bridge; closed November 2012
 Natural Bridge Wax Museum, Natural Bridge, closed in 2014
 P. Buckley Moss Museum, Waynesboro, closed in 2014
 Presidents Park (Virginia), Williamsburg, closed as of 9/30/10
 Professor Cline's Haunted Monster Museum and Dark Maze, Natural Bridge; destroyed in a fire April 16, 2012.
 Refuge Waterfowl Museum, Chincoteague, closed in 2013 and contents auctioned
 Smithsonian Institution Naturalist Center, Leesburg, closed in 2011
 Statlers Museum, Staunton, museum of the Statler Brothers, closed in 2002
 United States Geological Survey Visitors Center, Reston
 United States National Slavery Museum
 Virginia's Explore Park

Regions of Virginia
As defined by Virginia Tourism site
 Central: Altavista, Amelia, Amherst, Appomattox, Bedford, Blackstone, Charlottesville, Chester, Chesterfield, Colonial Heights, Farmville, Fort Lee, Glen Allen, Goochland, Gordonsville, Hampden-Sydney, Hood, Hopewell, Louisa, Lynchburg, Mineral, Orange, Palmyra, Pamplin, Petersburg, Piney River, Powhatan, Richmond, Schuyler, Scottsville.
 Chesapeake Bay region: Essex, Gloucester, King & Queen, King George, King William, Lancaster, Mathews, Middlesex, Northumberland, Richmond, Westmoreland
 Northern: Alexandria, Arlington, Brandy Station, Chantilly, Crewe, Culpeper, Dumfries, Fairfax, Fairfax Station, Falmouth, Fredericksburg, Goldvein, Gum Springs, Haymarket, Herndon, Leesburg, Lovettsville, Manassas, McLean, Middleburg, Mount Vernon, Occoquan, Potomac Mills, Reston, Spotsylvania, Sterling, Vienna, Warrenton, Woodford, White Post.
 Tidewater/Hampton Roads: Chesapeake, Courtland, Fort Monroe, Hampton, Jamestown, King William, Montross, Newport News, Norfolk, Portsmouth, Smithfield, Suffolk, Surry, Virginia Beach, Williamsburg, Yorktown and Chincoteague/Assateague on the Eastern Shore.
 Shenandoah Valley: Boyce, Bridgewater, Clifton Forge, Dayton, Edinburg, Elkton, Fincastle, Front Royal, Harrisonburg, Lexington, Luray, McDowell, Middletown, Millwood, Monterey, Mount Jackson, Natural Bridge, New Castle, Port Republic, Roanoke, Salem, Staunton, Steeles Tavern, Stephens City, Strasburg, Timberville, Waynesboro, Winchester, Woodstock.
 Southern: Clarksville, Danville, Gretna, Halifax, Martinsville, South Boston, South Hill.
 Blue Ridge Highlands: Abingdon, Ararat, Atkins, Bastian, Blacksburg, Bland, Bristol, Cana, Christianburg, Ferrum, Galax, Hillsville, Marion, Newbern, Pearlsburg, Pulaski, Saltville, Stuart, Radford, Woodlawn, Wytheville.

See also
 Aquaria in Virginia
 Nature Centers in Virginia

References

External links
 Museums: Virginia is for Lovers
 Local Historical Societies in Virginia
 Virginia Association of Museums

Virginia
 
Museums
Museums